The Sordones were an ancient (Pre-Roman) people of the Iberian Peninsula (the Roman Hispania). They are believed to have spoken the Iberian language. Their territory was located in the Roussillon, in what is now the French département of Pyrénées-Orientales and was limited in the west by the Pyrenees. They are classified as ancient Iberian or as ancient Gauls according to the sources.

The main towns of the Sordones were Ruscino, present-day Château-Roussillon near Perpignan, and Illiberis, present day Elne.

See also
Iberians
Pre-Roman peoples of the Iberian Peninsula

References

External links
Detailed map of the Pre-Roman Peoples of Iberia (around 200 BC)
Cité antique de Ruscino - Perpigna Town Hall Webpage

Pre-Roman peoples of the Iberian Peninsula
Ancient peoples of Spain
History of Catalonia